Samuel William Schmitthenner (February 23, 1928 – May 17, 2015) was a Lutheran who served as the President of the Protestant Andhra Evangelical Lutheran Church Society in Guntur District, Andhra Pradesh, India from 1969 to 1981.

S. W. Schmitthenner initially served as a missionary to India from 1952 onwards.

Studies
S. W. Schmitthenner studied at the Kodaikanal International School in Tamil Nadu and in 1944 moved on to Gettysburg College, Gettysburg, Pennsylvania where he earned a graduate degree in 1948. He continued his studies and earned a Master of Divinity (M. Div.) degree from the Lutheran Theological Seminary at Gettysburg in 1951.

While serving as a Pastor of the Andhra Evangelical Lutheran Church Society in Andhra Pradesh, India from 1952 onwards, Schmitthenner returned twice to America to upgrade his academics. In 1958-1959 he attended the Kennedy School of Missions at Hartford, Connecticut and again in 1966 he joined the University of Pennsylvania for studying Indian Sociology.

Contribution

References

Further reading
 
 
 
 
 
 
 

Indian Lutherans
Translators of the Bible into Telugu
Telugu people
People from Rajahmundry
Christian clergy from Andhra Pradesh
20th-century Indian translators
1928 births
2015 deaths
20th-century Lutherans